The four teams in this group played against each other on a home-and-away basis. The winner Italy qualified for the eighth FIFA World Cup held in England.

Matches

 

 

 

 

 

 

 

 

 

 

 

Italy qualified.

Final Table

Team stats

Head coach:  Edmondo Fabbri

Head coach:  Ian McColl (first match);  Jock Stein (second to sixth match)

Head coach:  Wiesław Motoczyński,  Ryszard Koncewicz, and  Karol Krawczyk

Head coach:  Olavi Laaksonen

Notes

External links
FIFA official page
RSSSF - 1966 World Cup Qualification
Allworldcup

8
1964–65 in Italian football
Qual
1964–65 in Scottish football
1965–66 in Scottish football
1964–65 in Polish football
1965–66 in Polish football
1964 in Finnish football
1965 in Finnish football